At least 10 people died and more than 60 were wounded in a suicide bomb attack in Kabul, Afghanistan, on 22 August 2015.

Casualties
At least 10 people were killed, and 60 people wounded, including a woman and 3 NATO troops.

See also
 List of terrorist incidents, 2015
 List of terrorist attacks in Kabul

References

2015 murders in Afghanistan
Suicide bombings in 2015
Taliban attacks
Terrorist incidents in Kabul
Terrorist incidents in Afghanistan in 2015
Mass murder in Afghanistan
Mass murder in Kabul
Mass murder in 2015
Suicide bombings in Afghanistan
2015 in Kabul
August 2015 events in Afghanistan
August 2015 crimes in Asia